The Ice Palace is a 1987 Norwegian drama film directed by Per Blom based on the novel of the same name. The film was selected as the Norwegian entry for the Best Foreign Language Film at the 61st Academy Awards, but was not accepted as a nominee.

Cast
 Line Storesund as Siss
 Hilde Nyeggen Martinsen as Unn
 Merete Moen as Moster / Aunt
 Sigrid Huun as Mother / Moren
 Vidar Sandem as Father
 Knut Ørvig as En eldre mann / Old Man
 Urda Brattrud Larsen as Bente
 Charlotte Lundestad as Den nye jenta

See also
 List of submissions to the 61st Academy Awards for Best Foreign Language Film
 List of Norwegian submissions for the Academy Award for Best Foreign Language Film

References

External links
 

1987 films
1987 drama films
Norwegian drama films
1980s Norwegian-language films
Films directed by Per Blom
Films based on works by Tarjei Vesaas